Cassiella is a genus of sea snails, marine gastropod mollusks in the family Cerithiidae.

Species
Species within the genus Cassiella include:

 Cassiella abylensis Gofas, 1987

References

Cerithiidae
Monotypic gastropod genera